Four Corners is an American prime time television drama that ran from February 24, 1998, to March 3, 1998, on CBS. It was produced by David Jacobs.

Synopsis 
Following the death of her husband in a plane crash, Amanda Wyatt (Ann-Margret) struggles to keep her sprawling Homestead Ranch out of the hands of property developers. Working against her is her devious son Alex (Douglas Wert) who wants to sell the land to developers and leave with her cash. Her friend Carlotta (Sônia Braga) is also fighting to keep the land out of the developers' hands as she represents the migrant workers of the area who depend on the land for their income. Other characters included Carlotta's son Tomas (Kamar de los Reyes) who had been in love with Amanda's flighty daughter Kate (Megan Ward) but had given her up for a life in the church but is now fighting his feelings for her; Sam (Raymond J. Barry), the ranch foreman and potential love interest for Amanda, caring school teacher Eva (Dahlia Waingort) and Caleb (Justin Chambers), the wayward son of Sam who has just been released from jail.

Cast 
 Ann-Margret as Amanda "Maggie" Wyatt
 Douglas Wert as Alex Wyatt  
 Megan Ward as Kate Wyatt
 Sônia Braga as Carlotta Alvarez
 Kamar de los Reyes as Tomas Alvarez
 Dahlia Waingort as Eva Alvarez
 Raymond J. Barry as Sam Haskell
 Justin Chambers as Caleb Haskell
 Tim Carhart as Sheriff

Production 
The series was produced by Michael Filerman and David Jacobs, who both worked on Dallas, Knots Landing and Falcon Crest. The show went through a number of name changes before going on air with the series being called Ventanas, Santa Fe and Homestead before they settled on Four Corners. The show was supposed to be co-produced by Columbia TriStar Television, but CTT sold its interest in the show to Rysher Entertainment.

Location filming for the show took place in the San Gabriel Mountains in California. The first episode was shown as a two-hour movie on CBS in the 9.00-11.00 slot on Tuesday February 24, 1998, with the next episode shown in what was supposed to be its regular one-hour slot at 10.00 on March 3, 1998. It was the first drama on US network TV to be simulcast in both English and Spanish.

The show was one of the highly touted shows of the 1997–98 season but quickly became one of its biggest disasters as it was taken off air after only two episodes. It was subsequently rebroadcast on Lifetime Television as a two-part TV movie under the new title of Homestead, a title also used in other countries. It has been aired sporadically on UK digital TV channel CBS Drama since the channel launched in 2009.

Episodes

Awards and nominations 
Christopher Klatman was nominated for an Emmy Award for Outstanding Main Title Theme Music in 1998 but lost to Fame L.A..

References

External links 
 
 

1998 American television series debuts
1998 American television series endings
CBS original programming
English-language television shows
Television shows set in California